Predhuman K. Joseph Dhar popularly known as PK Joseph Dhar, was an author, social worker and a writer.

Personal life 
Dhar was born in Srinagar, Kashmir but forced to leave Kashmir and migrate to Jammu in year 1990.

Notability 
He translated the Bible into the Kashmiri language, which was released by the Apostolic Nuncio to India. The Kashmiri version includes the Books of the Apocrypha as well; this work is published by the Bible Society of India.

Dhar belonged to a Kashmiri Pandit family but embraced Christianity in 1984. He served as a Chief spokesperson for All Jammu and Kashmir Catholic Sabha and took initiatives for the welfare of minorities in the state.

Dhar was also the convener of the Catholic Christian Forum of Jammu and Kashmir and also principal of Coventry Scholars school in Chinore, Jammu for few years. The DD Kashir has telecast a 28-minute documentary titled Shehil Kul (Shady Tree) about Dhar.

Death
Dhar died on 12 June 2014.

References

Writers from Jammu and Kashmir
Indian social workers
Indian Roman Catholics
Converts to Roman Catholicism from Hinduism
Social workers from Jammu and Kashmir
2014 deaths
Year of birth missing